The 1996 Arab Junior Athletics Championships was the seventh edition of the international athletics competition for under-20 athletes from Arab countries. It took place in Latakia, Syria. A total of 41 athletics events were contested, 22 for men and 19 for women. Morocco, a regional power in the sport, did not send a team to the meeting.

The road race competition was dropped from the programme, matching the change at the 1996 World Junior Championships in Athletics and a general move away from road running events for junior athletes. A women's 5000 metres replaced the 3000 metres, but this was a short-lived change as the 3000 m was brought back the following edition. This was the last time the women's 10,000 metres was held (the 5000 m taking its place at future editions (a change also reflected at world junior level).

Algeria topped the medal table with twelve gold medals, closely followed by Tunisia on ten golds. Saudi Arabia managed seven gold medals despite having no participation in the women's section. Sudan won its first titles at the competition, courtesy of Mohammed Yagoub's middle-distance double.

In the men's section, Algeria provided the most prominent athletes. Abderrahmane Hammad improved one place from the last edition to win the high jump – an event he won an Olympic medal in four years later. Two others here would medal at the 2000 Sydney Olympics: 800 metres bronze medallist Djabir Saïd-Guerni and 1500 metres runner-up Ali Saïdi-Sief. Two Saudi Arabian medallists later became successful seniors: Mukhlid Al-Otaibi (5000 m runner-up here) did a long-distance double at the 2002 Asian Games; 15-year-old Hamdan Al-Bishi won a 200 m bronze in Latakia and won numerous medals at Asian level. Tunisia's Sofiane Labidi won a 200 m/400 m double and later won African and Arab medals as a senior. Jean-Claude Rabbath, runner-up in the high jump, was Lebanon's first ever medallist at the tournament.

In the women's section Algeria's Baya Rahouli was dominant: she won the 100 metres, long jump and triple jump titles, and also a shot put bronze. This versatility continued at the 1997 Pan Arab Games, where she was a quadruple gold medallist. Double sprint medallist Nahida Touhami would also become a senior champion at the Arab Games. Fatma Lanouar was a double medallist in middle-distance and was a two-time Mediterranean Games champion later in her a career.

Medal summary

Men

Women

Medal table

References

Arab Junior Athletics Championships
International athletics competitions hosted by Syria
Sport in Latakia
Arab Junior Athletics Championships
Arab Junior Athletics Championships
1996 in youth sport